The Hypno-Hustler is a fictional character appearing in American comic books published by Marvel Comics.

A feature film centered around the character is in development, as a part of Sony's Spider-Man Universe. Donald Glover is cast in the lead role.

Publication history
Hypno-Hustler first appeared in Peter Parker, the Spectacular Spider-Man #24 (November 1978), created by Bill Mantlo and Frank Springer.

Fictional character biography
Antoine Desloin is the lead singer of the Mercy Killers, going by the name of Hypno-Hustler. He and his band were scheduled to perform at a nightclub called "Beyond Forever". When the club's manager catches Hypno-Hustler robbing his safe, Hypno-Hustler used his hypnotic equipment on the manager. When it came time to perform, Hypno-Hustler and his band used their hypnotizing equipment on the audience in a plan to rob them as well. Peter Parker was at the club at the time and changed into Spider-Man. During the fight, Spider-Man discovered that Hypno-Hustler's headphones protected him from his own hypnotic music. Spider-Man managed to remove them from Hypno-Hustler causing him to become a victim of his own hypnosis. When the audience was free of the hypnosis, Hypno-Hustler and his Mercy Killers were webbed up and left for the police.

Hypno-Hustler later appeared at the Vil-Anon meeting with Armadillo, Big Wheel, Equinox, Man-Bull, and Schizoid Man.

When Tombstone needed a heart bypass when in prison, Hypno-Hustler was among the inmates that Tombstone hired to protect him.

During the "Origin of the Species" storyline, Hypno-Hustler comes into the police station wanting help as Spider-Man is on a rampage against the villains ever since Menace's baby was stolen from her by the Chameleon.

After Tinkerer repairs his costume, Hypno-Hustler tries to escape from prison only to be defeated by Deadpool and Spider-Man.

During the "Hunted" storyline, Hypno-Hustler was seen as a patron at the Pop-Up with No Name.

Powers and abilities
The Hypno-Hustler can perform hypnosis with the aid of his guitar, and when teamed with his backup band, The Mercy Killers, can perform mass hypnosis. His boots can emit knockout gas on demand, and have retractable knives in the soles.

Other versions

House of M
Hypno-Hustler made a cameo in House of M in the crowds and it was not revealed if he played a part in this reality.

Spider-Man: Reign
In the alternate future of Spider-Man: Reign as conceived by Kaare Andrews, in which many superheroes had grown old and retired, Hypno-Hustler is an aged supervillain, now sympathizing with Spider-Man. Realizing that Spider-Man is coming out of retirement and the Reign will be challenged, he attempts to help by using his old hypno-music from a boombox to distract Reign officers and encourage citizens to revolt. However, his boombox loses battery power and the Reign officers swiftly retaliate with deadly force, killing him immediately.

In other media

Film
 A solo Hypno-Hustler movie set in Sony's Spider-Man Universe is currently in development by Sony Pictures with Donald Glover set to star and produce.

Television
 Hypno-Hustler appears in The Avengers: Earth's Mightiest Heroes. In the episode "Some Assembly Required", his head can be seen as part of the escaped criminals that are supposed to be hunted down by the Avengers. In "This Hostage Earth", Hawkeye tries to remember Chemistro's name, and mentions Hypno-Hustler, along with Paste-Pot Pete, as one of his likely names.

Video games
 Hypno-Hustler is mentioned in the Xbox 360, Wii, and PlayStation 2 versions of Spider-Man: Friend or Foe. When Spider-Man faces Rhino, he says, "Startin' to scrape the bottom of the ol' villain barrel, eh? Who's next, Hypno-Hustler?" Rhino then comments, "I'll Hypno-Hustle *you*".
 Hypno-Hustler appears as an assist character in the PlayStation 2 and PlayStation Portable versions of Spider-Man: Web of Shadows. When summoned, he can vanquish all of the enemies in the area by his guitar.

Reception
The Hypno-Hustler has received negative reviews as a supervillain, sometimes being ranked as one of the worst supervillains in comic books due to his outdated 1970s camp factor. ShortList ranked the Hypno-Hustler as the second worst supervillain of all time. Meanwhile, heavy.com listed him as one of the 20 worst supervillains. CraveOnline put the Hypno-Hustler at number 3 of their "five Spider-Man villains you will never see in theaters" list, describing him as "a recurring joke in the Marvel Universe for decades". Tony Wilson of Dorkly referenced him as one of Spider-Man's "Dumbest Forgotten Villains" in his "Today in Nerd History" sketch comedy video.

In 2022, CBR.com ranked Hypno-Hustler 7th in their "Spider-Man's 10 Funniest Villains" list, while Screen Rant ranked Hypno-Huster 9th in their "10 Most Powerful Silk Villains In Marvel Comics" list.

References

External links
 Hypno-Hustler at Marvel.com
 Hypno-Hustler at Marvel Wiki
 Hypno-Hustler  at Comic Book Database
Hypno-Hustler at the Appendix to the Marvel Handbook

Characters created by Bill Mantlo
Comics characters introduced in 1978
Fictional singers
Fictional technopaths
Marvel Comics supervillains
Marvel Comics male supervillains
Fictional African-American people
Spider-Man characters
Fictional hypnotists and indoctrinators